This is a list of dams and reservoirs in the United Kingdom.

England

Buckinghamshire
Foxcote Reservoir, north of Buckingham
Weston Turville Reservoir, between Weston Turville and Wendover

Cambridgeshire
Grafham Water

Cheshire

Bollinhurst Reservoir
Bosley Reservoir, Bosley
Horse Coppice Reservoir
Lamaload Reservoir, east of Macclesfield
Lymm Dam, Lymm.
Ridgegate Reservoir and Trentabank Reservoir, south-east of Macclesfield
Sutton Reservoir, south of Macclesfield

Cornwall

 Argal and College Reservoirs, Falmouth
 Boscathnoe Reservoir, Penzance
 Bussow Reservoir, St Ives
 Cargenwen Reservoir
 Colliford Lake, Bodmin Moor
 Crowdy Reservoir, Bodmin Moor
 Drift Reservoir, Penzance
 Porth Reservoir, Newquay
 Siblyback Lake, Bodmin Moor
 Stithians Reservoir
 Upper Tamar Lake (Devon and Cornwall)

County Durham

Balderhead Reservoir
Blackton Reservoir
Burnhope Reservoir
Derwent Reservoir
Grassholme Reservoir
Hisehope Reservoir
Hurworth Burn Reservoir
Hury Reservoir
Selset Reservoir
Smiddy Shaw Reservoir
Tunstall Reservoir
Waskerley Reservoir

Cumbria

Borrans Reservoir, north of Windermere (town)
Castle Carrock Reservoir
Chapelhouse Reservoir, south-east of Uldale
Cow Green Reservoir east of Dufton Fell
Dubbs Reservoir, north of Windermere (town)
Ennerdale Water
Fisher Tarn east of Kendal
Harlock Reservoir, Pennington Reservoir, Poaka Beck Reservoir west of the town of Ulverston
Haweswater Reservoir
Hayeswater
Kentmere Reservoir
Killington Reservoir
Meadley Reservoir, by Flat Fell, Ennerdale, Cumbria
Simpson Ground Reservoir, east of Newby Bridge
Thirlmere
Wet Sleddale Reservoir

Derbyshire

Butterley Reservoir
Codnor Reservoir
Carsington Water
Combs Reservoir
Errwood Reservoir
Fernilee Reservoir
Foremark Reservoir
Hurst Reservoir
Kinder Reservoir
Linacre Reservoirs
Upper Reservoir
Middle Reservoir
Lower Reservoir
 Longdendale Chain of reservoirs
Arnfield Reservoir
Hollingworth Reservoir now drained and a nature reserve
Bottoms Reservoir
Valehouse Reservoir
Rhodeswood Reservoir
Torside Reservoir
Woodhead Reservoir
 Loscoe Dam
 Mossy Lea Reservoir
 Ogston Reservoir
Staunton Harold Reservoir
Swineshaw Reservoir (Derbyshire)
Toddbrook Reservoir
Upper Derwent Valley
Ladybower Reservoir
Derwent Reservoir with Birchinlee
Howden Reservoir Eastern half is in Sheffield (South Yorkshire)
Upper Swineshaw Reservoir (Derbyshire)

Devon

Avon Dam Reservoir
Burrator Reservoir
Challacombe/Bray Reservoir
Butter Brook Reservoir
Darracott Reservoir
Fernworthy Reservoir
Gammaton Reservoirs
Holywell Reservoir
Jennetts Reservoir
Kennick Reservoir
Lower Tamar Lake
Melbury Reservoir
Meldon Reservoir
River Tavy Reservoir
Roadford Lake
Slade Reservoir
Squabmoor reservoir
Tottiford Reservoir
Trenchford Reservoir
Upper Tamar Lake (Devon and Cornwall)
Venford Reservoir
Wheal Jewell Reservoir
Wistlandpound Reservoir

East Sussex
Arlington Reservoir
Darwell Reservoir
Powdermill Reservoir

Essex
Abberton Reservoir
Ardleigh Reservoir
Hanningfield Reservoir

Gloucestershire
Dowdeswell Reservoir
Witcombe Reservoir

Greater Manchester

Bolton:
Belmont Reservoir
Bryan Hey Reservoir
Dean Mills Reservoir
High Rid Reservoir
Lower Rivington Reservoir
Rumworth Lodge Reservoir
Upper Rivington Reservoir
Bury
Lowercroft Reservoir
Manchester, Bolton and Bury Reservoir (Elton Reservoir)
Manchester:
Gorton Reservoirs
Heaton Park Reservoir
Oldham:
Ashworth Moor Reservoir
Besom Hill Reservoir
Black Moss Reservoir (Greater Manchester)
Brownhouse Wham Reservoir
Brushes Clough Reservoir
Castleshaw Reservoir
Chew_Reservoir
Crook Gate Reservoir
Diggle Reservoir
Dovestones Reservoir
Dowry Reservoir
Greenfield Reservoir
Hamer Pasture Reservoir
New Years Bridge Reservoir
Readycon Dean Reservoir
Strinesdale Reservoir
Yeoman Hey Reservoir
Rochdale:
Ashworth Moor Reservoir
Blackstone Edge Reservoir
Chelburn Reservoir
Greenbooth Reservoir
Hanging Lees Reservoir
Hollingworth Lake
Kitcliffe Reservoir
Light Hazzles Reservoir
Lower Chelburn Reservoir
Naden Reservoirs (Higher, Middle and Lower)
Norman Hill Reservoir
Ogden Reservoir
Piethorne Reservoir
Rooden Reservoir
Watergrove Reservoir
Tameside:
Audenshaw Reservoirs
Brushes Reservoir
Denton Reservoirs
Godley Reservoir
Higher Swineshaw Reservoir
Lower Swineshaw Reservoir
Swineshaw Reservoirs
Walkerwood Reservoir
Wigan:
Worthington Lakes

Hertfordshire
Tring Reservoirs

Kent
Bough Beech
Bewl Water

Lancashire

Anglezarke Reservoir
Belmont Reservoir
Black Moss Reservoirs
Calf Hey Reservoir
Cowm Reservoir
Delph Reservoir
Dingle Reservoir
Foulridge Reservoir
High Bullough Reservoir
Holden Wood Reservoir
Jumbles Reservoir
Lower Rivington Reservoir
Lower Roddlesworth Reservoir
Lower Ogden Reservoir
Rake Brook Reservoir
Spring Mill Reservoir
Springs Reservoir
Stocks Reservoir
Turton and Entwistle Reservoir
Upper Ogden Reservoir
Upper Rivington Reservoir
Upper Roddlesworth Reservoir
Walves Reservoir
Ward's Reservoir (Blue Lagoon)
Watersheddles Reservoir (owned by Yorkshire Water)
Wayoh Reservoir
Yarrow Reservoir

Leicestershire

Blackbrook Reservoir
Eyebrook Reservoir (Corby)
Cropston Reservoir
Knipton Reservoir
Nanpantan Reservoir
Saddington Reservoir
Staunton Harold Reservoir
Swithland Reservoir
Thornton Reservoir

Lincolnshire
Covenham Reservoir
Denton Reservoir
Knipton Reservoir

London

Brent Reservoir (also known as the Welsh Harp)
Grand Junction Reservoir
Stain Hill Reservoirs
Stoke Newington West Reservoir
Sunnyside Reservoir
The following reservoirs form the Lee Valley Reservoir Chain.
King George's Reservoir, London Borough of Enfield (also known as King George V Reservoir)
William Girling Reservoir, London Borough of Enfield
Banbury Reservoir, London Borough of Waltham Forest
Lockwood Reservoir, London Borough of Waltham Forest
High Maynard Reservoir, London Borough of Waltham Forest
Low Maynard Reservoir, London Borough of Waltham Forest
Walthamstow Reservoirs, London Borough of Waltham Forest, five linked numbered reservoirs
East Warwick Reservoir, London Borough of Waltham Forest
West Warwick Reservoir, London Borough of Waltham Forest

Northamptonshire

Barby Storage Reservoir
Boddington Reservoir, Oxford canal supply reservoir, Upper Boddington
Cransley Reservoir (Kettering)
Daventry Reservoir in Daventry Country Park
Drayton Reservoir (Daventry)
Hollowell reservoir Hollowell
Naseby Reservoir, Grand Union Canal supply, Naseby
Pitsford Water
Ravensthorpe Reservoir
Stanford Reservoir, between Stanford-on-Avon and South Kilworth
Sulby Reservoir
Sywell Reservoir
Thorpe Malsor Reservoir (Kettering)
Welford Reservoir

Northumberland

Bakethin Reservoir
Catcleugh Reservoir
Colt Crag Reservoir
Fontburn
Hallington Reservoirs
Little Swinburne Reservoir
Kielder Water
Whittle Dene

North Yorkshire

Angram Reservoir
Beaver Dyke Reservoirs
Chelker Reservoir
Cod Beck Reservoir
Elslack Reservoir
Embsay Reservoir
Fewston Reservoir
Gouthwaite Reservoir
Grimwith Reservoir
Laneshaw Reservoir
Leighton Reservoir
Lindley Wood Reservoir
Lockwood Beck Reservoir
Lower Barden Reservoir
Lumley Moor Reservoir
March Ghyll Reservoir
Mossy Moor Reservoir
Oulston Reservoir
Roundhill Reservoir
Scaling Dam Reservoir
Scar House Reservoir
Scargill Reservoir
Swinsty Reservoir
Ten Acre Reservoir
Thornton Steward Reservoir
Thruscross Reservoir
Upper Barden Reservoir
Winterburn Reservoir

Oxfordshire
Clattercote Reservoir (Banbury)
Farmoor Reservoir (Oxford)
Grimsbury Reservoir,(Banbury)

Rutland
Rutland Water

Shropshire
 Chelmarsh Reservoir
 Knighton Reservoir

Somerset

Ashford Reservoir
Barrow Gurney Tanks
Blagdon Lake
Chard Reservoir
Cheddar Reservoir
Chew Valley Lake
Clatworthy Reservoir
Durleigh reservoir
Hawkridge Reservoir
Leigh Reservoir
Litton Reservoirs
Luxhay Reservoir
Nutscale Reservoir
Otterhead Lakes
Sutton Bingham Reservoir
Wimbleball Lake

South Yorkshire

Agden Reservoir
Broadstone Reservoir
Broomhead Reservoir
Dale Dyke Reservoir
Damflask Reservoir
Elsecar Reservoir
Harthill Reservoir, feeder for the Chesterfield canal
Howden Reservoir Western half is in Derbyshire
Ingbirchworth Reservoir
Langsett Reservoir
Midhope Reservoir
More Hall Reservoir
Pebley Reservoir (Sheffield)
Redmires Reservoirs
Rivelin Dams
Royd Moor Reservoir
Scout Dyke Reservoir
Snailsden Reservoir
Strines Reservoir
Ulley Reservoir
Underbank Reservoir
Weecher Reservoir
Wharncliffe Reservoir
Windleden Reservoirs
Winscar Reservoir
Worsbrough Reservoir

Staffordshire

Bathpool Park Lake
Belvide Reservoir
Betley Hall Reservoir
Blithfield Reservoir
Bromley Mill Pool
Brookleys Lake
Canwell Estate Reservoir
Chasewater
Gailey Reservoir
Gap Pool
Hales Hall Pool
Hatherton Reservoir
Hanch Reservoir
Holly Bush Lake
Knypersley Reservoir
Minster Pool
Rudyard Lake
Stowe Pool
Swinfen Lake
Tixall Park Pool
Trentham Gardens Lake
Tittesworth Reservoir

Surrey

Bessborough Reservoir
Island Barn Reservoir
King George VI Reservoir
Knight Reservoir
Molesey Reservoirs
Queen Elizabeth II Reservoir
Queen Mary Reservoir
Queen Mother Reservoir
Staines Reservoirs
Wraysbury Reservoir

Suffolk
Alton Water

Warwickshire

Draycote Water
Napton Reservoir, Grand Union Canal
Oldbury Reservoir
Packington Lakes, Grand Union Canal
Shustoke Reservoirs
Stockton Reservoir, Grand Union Canal
Wormleighton Reservoir

West Midlands

Bartley Reservoir (Birmingham)
Brookvale Park Lake (Birmingham)
Edgbaston Reservoir (Birmingham)
Frankley Reservoir (Birmingham)
Lifford Reservoir (Birmingham)
Netherton Reservoir, Dudley
Olton Reservoir, Solihull
Perry Barr Reservoir (covered) (Birmingham)
Witton Lakes (Birmingham)
 see also Elan Valley Reservoirs (Wales) which were built by, and supply, Birmingham

West Sussex
Ardingly Reservoir
Weir Wood Reservoir

West Yorkshire

Ardsley Reservoir
Baitings Reservoir
Bilberry Reservoir
Blackmoorfoot Reservoir
Black Moss Reservoir
Blakeley Reservoir
Booth Dean Upper Reservoir
Booth Dean Lower Reservoir
Booth Wood Reservoir
Boshaw Whams Reservoir
Brownhill Reservoir
Butterley Reservoir
Chelker Reservoir
Cupwith Reservoir
Dean Head Upper Reservoir
Dean Head Lower Reservoir
Dean Head Reservoir
Deer Hill Reservoir
Digley Reservoir
Doe Park Reservoir
Eccup Reservoir
Eldwick Reservoir
Elslack Reservoir
Gorple Lower Reservoir
Gorple Upper Reservoir
Graincliffe Reservoir
Green Withens Reservoir
Hewenden Reservoir
Holme Styes Reservoir
Keighley Moor Reservoir
Leeming Reservoir
Leeshaw Reservoir
Lower Laithe Reservoir
March Ghyll Reservoir
March Hey Reservoir
Mixenden Reservoir
Ogden Reservoir
Panorama Reservoir
Ponden Reservoir
Ramsden Reservoir
Redbrook Reservoir
Reva Reservoir
Riding Wood Reservoir
Ringstone Edge Reservoir
Ryburn Reservoir
Scammonden Reservoir
Silsden Reservoir
Stubden Reservoir
Sunnydale Reservoir
Swellands Reservoir
Thornton Moor Reservoir
Walshaw Dean Reservoirs
Warland Reservoir (Mostly in West Yorkshire, partly in Greater Manchester)
Warley Moor Reservoir
Weecher Reservoir
Wessenden Reservoir
Wessenden Head Reservoir
Widdop Reservoir
Yateholme Reservoir

Wiltshire
Wilton Water header reservoir for the Kennet and Avon Canal

Worcestershire
Bittell Reservoirs (Upper and Lower)
Tardebigge Reservoir

Northern Ireland

County Down
Silent Valley Reservoir
Spelga Reservoir

Scotland

City of Aberdeen

Braeside Reservoir
Cattofield Reservoir
Mannofield Reservoir
Slopefield Reservoir
Smithfield Reservoir

Aberdeenshire

Bluehills Reservoir
Clochandighter Reservoir
Garlogie Dam
Inchgarth Reservoir - Cults
Loch of Aboyne
Loch Saugh
Silver Dam aka Culter Compensation Dam

Angus

Backwater Reservoir
Brewlands Reservoir
Crombie Reservoir
Den of Ogil
Glenogil
Kinnaird Lake
Ledcrieff Loch
Linrathen
Linrathen Clear Water Storage
Loch Auchintaple or Auchintaple Loch
Loch Lee
Loch Shandra
Long Loch
Monikie Clear Water Basin
Monikie North Pond
Monikie South (Island) Pond
Piperdam Loch

Argyll and Bute

Allt na Lairige - Glen Fyne
Ardlussa Fishing Loch - Isle of Jura
Asgog Loch - Tighnabruaich
Aucha Lochy - Campbeltown
Auchengaich Reservoir - Glen Fruin
Beochlich - 9 km NW of Inveraray
Bishop's Glen Reservoir (also known as Dunoon Reservoir) - Dunoon
Blackmill Loch - Minard
Cam Loch - North Knapdale
Craignafeich Reservoirs - Tighnabruaich
Crarae Reservoir - Minard
Crosshill Loch - Campbeltown
Cruachan Reservoir - Loch Awe
Daill Loch - North Knapdale
Dhu Loch - Bute
Feorlin - Minard
Gleann Dubh - Barcaldine
Gleann Loch - North Knapdale
Helensburgh No. 1 Reservoir - Helensburgh
Helensburgh No. 2 Reservoir - Helensburgh
Kilduskland Reservoir - Ardrishaig
Kirk Dam - Bute
Knockruan Loch - Campbeltown
Leorin Loch - Port Ellen, Islay
Lindowan Reservoir - Kilcreggan
Loch A' Bharain - North Knapdale
Loch A' Chaorainn - South Knapdale
Loch Allan - Port Askaig, Islay
Loch a'Mhuillin - North Knapdale
Loch an Add - North Knapdale
Loch an Droighinn - Kilchrenan
Loch an Sgoltaire - Isle of Colonsay
Loch an Torr - Dervaig, Isle of Mull
Loch Ascog - Isle of Bute
Loch Assapol - Bunessan, Isle of Mull
Loch Awe - part of the Awe hydroelectric scheme
Loch Ba - Gruline, Isle of Mull
Loch Bearnoch - Lochdon, Isle of Mull
Loch Beinn Uraraidh - Port Ellen, Islay
Loch Cam - Bridgend, Isle of Islay
Loch Chaorunn - South Knapdale
Loch Ciaran - Clachan, North Kintyre
Loch Clachaig - North Knapdale
Loch Eck - Cowal
Loch Fad - Bute
Loch Finlas - 4 km SW Luss
Loch Gearach - Port Charlotte, Islay
Loch Glashan - Lochgair, Mid-Argyll
Loch Gleann - Oban
Loch Iarnan - Port Ellen, Islay
Loch Leacann - Furnace
Loch Lebdgei (Dubh Loch) - North Knapdale
Loch Lebgei - North Knapdale
Loch Na Bric - North Knapdale
Loch na Creige Crainde - North Knapdale
Loch Na Faoilinn - North Knapdale
Loch Na Sreinge - 9 km NE of Kilmelford
Loch Nam Ban - Port Askaig, Islay
Loch Nam Breac Buidhe - North Knapdale
Loch Nan Torran - South Knapdale
Loch Righeachan - Inveraray
Loch Skerrols - Bridgend, Isle of Islay
Loch Sloy (Reservoir) - 6 km N of Arrochar
Loch Tarsan - Glen Lean, Cowal
Loch Tralaig - Kilmelford
Loch Turamin (New Loch) - Isle of Colonsay
Loch Uigeadail - Port Ellen, Islay
Lochan A' Ghurrabain - Tobermory, Isle of Mull
Lochan Duin - North Knapdale
Lochan Ghlas - Garelochhead
Lochan Gleann Astaile - Isle of Jura
Lochan Lasgainn Mor - Kilmelford
Lower Glen Shira - 12 km NE of Inveraray
Luachrach Loch - Oban
Main Glen Shira - 13 km NE of Inveraray
Mishnish Lochs - Tobermory, Isle of Mull
Nant Reservoir - Kilchrenan
Oude Reservoir - Kilmelford
Powder Mill Dam - Tighnabruaich
Sholum Lochs - Port Ellen, Islay
Still Loch - Ardrishaig
Strathduie Water - Campbeltown

Clackmannanshire
Gartmorn Dam

Dumfries and Galloway

Carsfad Loch
Clatteringshaws Loch
Glenkiln Reservoir
Kettleton Reservoir
Black Esk Dam
Winterhope Reservoir

City of Dundee
Clatto Reservoir

East Ayrshire

Afton Reservoir
Corsehouse Reservoir
Craigendunton Reservoir
Glenbuck Loch
Loch Finlas

East Dunbartonshire
Bankell Reservoir - supplies Milngavie water treatment works
Craigmaddie Reservoir - supplies Milngavie water treatment works
Mugdock Reservoir - supplies Milngavie water treatment works

East Lothian
Lammerloch
Stobshiel Reservoir
Whiteadder Reservoir

East Renfrewshire

Balgray Reservoir
Littleton Reservoir
Ryat Linn Reservoir
Waulkmill Glen Reservoir
Walton Dam
Glanderston Dam
Snypes Dam
Kirkton Dam
Harelaw Reservoir, Fereneze Golf Course
Harelaw Reservoir, Eaglesham Moor
Rouken Glen Pond
Craighall Reservoir
Commore Dam
White Loch
Black Loch
Brother Loch
Little Loch
Pilmuir Reservoir
Loch Craig
Bennan Loch
Corsehouse Reservoir (on the border with East Ayrshire)
Long Loch
Loch Goin
Dunwan Loch
High Dam
Picketlaw Reservoir
Caplaw Dam (on the border with Renfrewshire)
Netherplace Reservoir (at the dye works)
Glenburn Reservoir

City of Edinburgh

Clubbiedean Reservoir
Harlaw Reservoir
Threipmuir Reservoir
Torduff Reservoir
Bonaly Reservoir

Falkirk
Faughlin Reservoir
Millhall Reservoir

Fife

Ballo Reservoir
Clatto Reservoir
Cameron Reservoir
Castlehill Reservoir
Drumain Reservoir
Holl Reservoir
Harperleas Reservoir
Stenhouse Loch
Carriston Reservoir
Donald Rose Reservoir
Carlhurlie Reservoir

City of Glasgow
Hogganfield Loch

Highland

Blackwater Reservoir, near Kinlochleven
Clunas Reservoir
Loch Benevean
Loch Laggan and Loch Treig - both part of the Lochaber hydroelectric scheme
Loch Monar - part of the Strathfarrar hydroelectric scheme
Loch Quoich and Loch Garry - both part of the Glen Garry hydroelectric scheme
Loch Loyne and Loch Cluanie - both part of the Glen Moriston hydroelectric scheme
Loch Mullardoch - part of the Glen Affric hydroelectric scheme
Loch Glascarnoch

Inverclyde
Loch Thom
 Gryffe Reservoir
 Harelaw Reservoir
 Knocknair’shill Reservoir
 Dougliehill Reservoir

Midlothian

Edgelaw Reservoir
Gladhouse Reservoir
Glencorse Reservoir
North Esk Reservoir
Rosebery Reservoir
Loganlea Reservoir

Moray
Glenlatterach Reservoir

North Ayrshire

Auldmuir Reservoir
Barcraigs Reservoir
Busbie Muir Reservoir
Caaf Reservoir
Camphill Reservoir
Cuffhill Reservoir
Glenburn Reservoir
Kelly Reservoir
Knockendon Reservoir
Kirkleegreen Reservoir
Mill Glen Reservoir
Muirhead Reservoir
Munnoch Reservoir
Outerwards Reservoir
Skelmorlie Lower Reservoir
Skelmorlie Upper Reservoir

North Lanarkshire

Birkenburn
Broadwood Loch
Daer
Dalmacoulter
Forrestburn
Glenhove No. 1
Glenhove No. 2
Hillend Loch
Lilly Loch
Roughrigg
Strathclyde Park
Townhead Reservoir
West Corrie

Orkney
Wideford Hill Reservoir (drained)
Stromness Waterworks

Perth and Kinross

Dunalastair Water
Loch Tummel - part of the Tummel Valley hydroelectric scheme
Loch Turret Reservoir and Glenturret Dam. Near Crieff
Lower Glendevon Reservoir
Upper Glendevon Reservoir

Renfrewshire
Rowbank Reservoir

Scottish Borders

Alemoor Loch
Baddinsgill Reservoir
Fruid Reservoir
Megget Reservoir
Talla Reservoir
Westwater Reservoir

Shetland
Sandy Loch Reservoir

South Ayrshire

Bradan Service Reservoir
Collenan
Glendrissaigh
Loch Bradan
Loch Riecawr
Loch Spallander
Loch Spouts
Penwhapple
Raith

South Lanarkshire
Camps Reservoir
Culter Waterhead Reservoir

Stirling
Cocksburn Reservoir
Earlsburn Reservoir
North Third Reservoir

West Dunbartonshire

Cochno Loch
Jaw Reservoir
Greenside Reservoir
Carman Reservoir
Kilmannan Reservoir (on the border with Stirling)
Burncrooks Reservoir (on the border with Stirling)

West Lothian
Cobbinshaw Reservoir
Eliburn Reservoir
Harperrig Reservoir
Lochcote Reservoir

Western Isles
Loch Mor an Stairr - Isle of Lewis
Roghadal Reservoir - Isle of Harris

Wales

Anglesey
Llyn Alaw - water supply to much of north Anglesey
Llyn Cefni - water supply to central Anglesey

Cardiff
Llanishen Reservoir - water supply to Cardiff
Lisvane Reservoir - water Supply to Cardiff

Carmarthenshire
Upper and Cwm Lliedi reservoirs
Llyn Brianne
Llyn y Fan Fach
Usk Reservoir

Ceredigion
Dinas Reservoir
Teifi Pools
Llyn Teifi
Nant-y-moch Reservoir

Conwy

Llyn Bodgynydd - supply for the Pandora lead mine (disused)
Llyn Brenig - part of Dee Regulation system - also in Denbighshire
Llyn Coedty - water supply for Dolgarrog hydroelectric station
Llyn Conwy - water supply for Llanrwst and Betws-y-Coed
Llyn Cowlyd - water supply for Conwy and Colwyn Bay and for Dolgarrog hydroelectric station
Llyn Crafnant - water supply for Llanrwst
Llyn Dulyn - water supply for Llandudno
Llyn Melynllyn - water supply for Llandudno
Llyn Parc - supply for the Aberllyn mine (disused)
Llyn Elsi - water supply for Betws-y-Coed (disused)

Denbighshire

Aled Isaf Reservoir
Alwen Reservoir
Llyn Aled
Llyn Alwen
Llyn Brenig - part of the River Dee regulation system
Llyn Celyn - part of the River Dee regulation system. 
Pendinas Reservoir
Bala Lake (Llyn Tegid)
Nant-y-Ffrith Reservoir

Gwynedd

Llyn Anafon - water supply for Llanfairfechan, Dwygyfylchi and Penmaenmawr
Llyn Arenig Fach
Llyn Arenig Fawr - water supply for Bala town
Llynnau Barlwyd - supply to Llechwedd slate quarry
Llyn Bodlyn - water supply to Barmouth.
Llyn Bowydd - supply to the Blaenau Ffestiniog slate quarries
Llyn Cwm Corsiog - supply for Rhosydd slate quarry (disused)
Llyn Cwellyn - water supply to Bangor and parts of south Anglesey
Marchlyn Mawr - header reservoir for the Dinorwig power station hydroelectric system.
Llyn Peris
Llyn Padarn - part of  the Dinorwig hydroelectric system
Llyn Stwlan - built for the hydroelectric Ffestiniog Power Station
Llyn Trawsfynydd - built for the Maentwrog hydroelectric Power Station

Merthyr Tydfil
Llwyn-on Reservoir
Pontsticill Reservoir, including Pentwyn Reservoir

Neath Port Talbot
Eglwys Nunydd - water supply to Tata Steel Europe steel-works at Port Talbot

Pembrokeshire
Bosherston Lakes - artificial amenity lakes
Llys-y-Frân Reservoir
Rosebush Reservoir

Powys

Taff Fawr reservoirs- a chain of three reservoirs supplying the Rhondda and Taff valley and Cardiff with water
Beacons Reservoir
Cantref Reservoir
 also see Llwyn-on Reservoir in Merthyr Tydfil
Taff Fechan reservoirs - a chain of four reservoirs also supplying the Taff valley and Cardiff with water
Upper Neuadd Reservoir
Lower Neuadd Reservoir
Doly y gaer Reservoir
Pontsticill Reservoir
Elan Valley Reservoirs - a group of reservoirs supplying Birmingham and parts of the West Midlands conurbation with drinking water
Claerwen Reservoir
Craig-goch Reservoir
Penygarreg Reservoir
Garreg-ddu Reservoir
Caban-coch Reservoir
Lake Vyrnwy (Llyn Efyrnwy) - supplies water to the Liverpool area
Talybont Reservoir
Ystradfellte Reservoir
Clywedog Reservoir (Llyn Clywedog)

Rhondda Cynon Taf
Lluest-wen Reservoir

Swansea
Cray Reservoir
Swansea Barrage
Upper and Lower Lliw Reservoirs

Torfaen
Llandegfedd Reservoir

Wrexham
Cae Llwyd Reservoir
Ty Mawr Reservoir

See also
Ofwat
List of dams and reservoirs
Geography of the United Kingdom
List of lakes in England
List of loughs in Ireland
List of lochs in Scotland
List of lakes in Wales
List of rivers of the United Kingdom
Waterways in the United Kingdom

References

 
United Kingdom
Dams and reservoirs
Dams